McCann is an Irish surname derived from Mac Cana, meaning "son of Cana". The Irish personal name Cana literally means "wolf cub", and was a term for a young warrior. The Mac Cana were a Gaelic Irish clan who held the lands of Clancann and Clanbrassil, together known as Oneilland, in what is now northern County Armagh. The surname is strongly associated with that part of Ulster.

People named McCann
McCann is the surname of Irish origin
of several people, including:
 Austin McCann (born 1980), Scottish footballer
 Bert McCann (born 1932), Scottish footballer
 Bill McCann (1892–1957), Australian soldier of World War I
 Bob McCann (born 1964), American basketball player
 Brian McCann (actor) (born 1965), American writer/actor/comedian
 Brian McCann (baseball) (born 1984), American baseball player
 Bryan McCann (born 1987), American football player
 Carole McCann, American academic
 Casey McCann (c. 1943–2000), British anti-cult activist
 Charles McCann (1899–1980), Indian naturalist
 Charles J. McCann (1926–2015), an American college president
 Chris McCann (born 1987), Irish footballer
 Chuck McCann (1934–2018), American actor
 Colum McCann (born 1965), Irish writer
 Denise McCann (born 1948) American-Canadian singer/songwriter and CBC Radio contributor
 Donal McCann (1943–1999), Irish actor
 E. Michael McCann (born 1936), an American attorney and politician
 Eamonn McCann (born 1943), Irish journalist, author, and political activist
 Fergus McCann (born 1941), Scottish-Canadian businessman and entrepreneur
 Gavin McCann (born 1978), English footballer
 Gerald McCann (born 1950), American politician
 Gordon J. McCann (1908-2000), Canadian horse trainer
 Grant McCann (born 1980), Northern Irish footballer
 Henry McCann (born 1887), Scottish footballer
 Howie McCann (born 1956), American baseball player and coach; father of Brian
 Hugh McCann (born 1954), Scottish footballer
 Jack McCann (1910–1972), British politician
 James McCann (disambiguation), multiple people by the name of James or Jim
 Jared McCann (born 1996), Canadian ice hockey player
 John P. McCann (born 1952), American writer and producer
 Joe McCann (1947–1972), Irish Republican Army member
 Joseph McCann (academic) (1946–2015), American academic
 Joseph McCann (criminal) (born 1985), rapist
 Kate McCann, British political journalist
 Kerryn McCann (born 1967), Australian runner
 Kevin McCann, multiple people
 Les McCann (born 1935), American musician
 Lila McCann (born 1981), American country music singer
 Madeleine McCann (born 2003), British girl who disappeared on 3 May 2007, in Portugal
 Maria McCann (born 1956), English novelist
 Martin McCann, multiple people
 Mia Wray-McCann (born 1995), Australian pop singer, songwriter and musician, known professionally as Mia Wray
 Michael McCann, multiple people
 Neil McCann (born 1974), Scottish footballer
 Owen McCann (1907–1994), South African Cardinal
 Peter McCann (born 1950), American singer & songwriter
 Peter P. McCann, American philatelist
 Rachel McCann (born 1993), New Zealand field hockey player
 Rory McCann (born 1969), Scottish actor
 Rory McCann (cricketer) (born 1985), Irish cricketer
 Sean McCann, multiple people
 Terrence McCann (1934–2006), American wrestler
 Terry McCann, fictional character played by Dennis Waterman in Minder
 Tim McCann, multiple people
 Tucker McCann (born 1997), American football player
 Van McCann (born 1992), Welsh singer, songwriter & guitarist
 Wilma McCann (died 1975), the first victim of British serial killer Peter Sutcliffe

People named MacCann
 Philip MacCann (born 1969), Irish short story writer

See also
 Dick McCann Memorial Award, for football reporting
 McCann Field House
 McCann's Steel Cut Irish Oatmeal
 McGann

References

Anglicised Irish-language surnames
English-language surnames
Patronymic surnames